Inverness Ridge is a ridge located on the Point Reyes Peninsula in western Marin County, California.

See also
 Inverness
 Inverness Park
 Bolinas Ridge

References

Landforms of Marin County, California
Ridges of California
West Marin